
Gmina Międzyzdroje or Gmina Misdroy is an urban-rural gmina (administrative district) in Kamień County, West Pomeranian Voivodeship, in north-western Poland.

Villages
Apart from the town of Międzyzdroje, Gmina Międzyzdroje contains the villages and settlements of Grodno, Lubin, Trzciągowo, Wapnica, Wicko and Zalesie.

Neighbouring gminas
Gmina Międzyzdroje is bordered by the city of Świnoujście and by the gminas of Stepnica and Wolin.

References
Polish official population figures 2006

Miedzyzdroje
Kamień County